Romanian Christmas Carols, Sz, 57, BB 67 is a set of little colinde, typical Christmas songs from Romanian villages, habitually sung by small groups of children, adapted in 1915 by Hungarian composer Béla Bartók to be played on the piano after hearing them sung in the below villages.

Structure 

This work consists of twenty little songs put together into two major series. The movements are listed as follows:

Series A

Series B

The movement numbered XVIIb is generally appended to the previous one, and, in publications, the variation is represented as a single movement, even though it is clearly specified where the reprise begins. Bartók also wrote a concert version with slight variations to the original version. These changes consist mostly of denser chords and octaves.

Notable recordings 

Notable recordings of this composition include:

References

External links 
 

1915 compositions
Compositions by Béla Bartók
Compositions for solo piano